Abhisheki is a surname. Notable people with the surname include:

Jitendra Abhisheki (1929–1998), Indian singer and composer
Shounak Abhisheki, Indian singer and composer, son of Jitendra

Indian surnames